Posemkovichi is a small village in the Krupki District of Minsk Region, Belarus.

External links
 The murder of the Jews of Krupki during World War II, at Yad Vashem website.

Towns in Belarus
Populated places in Minsk Region
Krupki District
Holocaust locations in Belarus